The Winter Nelis pear is a deciduous pear tree growing to 8 m depending on rootstock, and is sparse and spreading in form. It is not frost tender. Its flowers are self-sterile and a pollinator tree is required that flowers at a similar time (its flowering group is D or 4). It is a late-season dessert pear. The fruit are medium in size and have outstanding storage properties for a pear, easily keeping for a couple of months.  Hoggs Fruit Manual (1880s) describes it as one of the richest flavoured pears, flesh being yellowish, fine-grained, buttery and melting, with a rich, sugary and vinous flavour and a fine aroma.
The pear is named after the Flemish nobleman  (1748–1834), who raised it from seed in the early 1800s. It was introduced to England in 1818 and to the United States in 1823

In 1869, Edward Berwick planted the first commercial pear orchard on the Berwick Manor and Orchard in  Carmel Valley, California, specializing in the Winter Nelis pear.

References 

Pear cultivars